Helga Labs (born 22 May 1940) is an East German politician who served as the minister of public education of East Germany. Being a member of the ruling party Socialist Unity Party (SED), she held several political and public posts in East Germany.

Early life and education
Labs was born in Wenigtreben on 22 May 1940. Between 1955 and 1959 she studied at the institute for teacher training in Rochlitz and received a degree in teaching.

Career
Labs joined the Rochlitz branch of the Free German Youth organization in 1956 and served as its secretary between 1959 and 1960. In 1959 he became a member of the SED. In 1974 she was named as the head of the Ernst Thälmann Pioneer Organisation, a youth organization, replacing Egon Krenz in the post. Lab's tenure lasted until 1985, and she was replaced by Wilfried Poßner in the post.

Labs was a member of the central committee of the SED from 1976 to 3 December 1989. She also served as chairman of the teaching and education union. In November 1989 she was appointed minister of public education, replacing Margot Honecker in the post.

References

External links

20th-century German women politicians
1940 births
Living people
Women government ministers of East Germany
Members of the Central Committee of the Socialist Unity Party of Germany
Free German Youth members
People from Bolesławiec County
Members of the 9th Volkskammer